Homoeocera rhodocera is a moth of the subfamily Arctiinae. It is found in Panama.

References

Euchromiina
Moths described in 1904